Ping Pong (Never too old for gold) is a 2012 documentary film, that follows eight pensioners from around the world as they train for and compete in the over 80's table tennis world championship in Inner Mongolia. The film's world premiere took place at Hot Docs Canadian International Documentary Festival in Toronto. It has since appeared at Sheffield Doc/Fest (and was pitched at the Doc/Fest's 2010 MeetMarket), DMZ International Documentary Film Festival, Zurich Film Festival, Calgary International Film Festival, Warsaw International Film Festival, Mumbai Film Festival, Guelph Festival of Moving Media, and San Francisco Doc Fest. The film opened in the UK with a theatrical release on 6 July 2012 and has since been shown at cinemas across the UK. It premiered in the US at DOC NYC in November 2012.

Cast
 Director - Hugh Hartford
 Producer - Anson Hartford
 Executive Producer - Beadie Finzi
 Executive Producer - Maxyne Franklin

Critical reception
Ping Pong received a very positive reception from critics. Total Film said it was "sincerely moving", while the Empire described it as "delightful, hilarious and completely inspiring".

References

External links
 
Official website

Canadian sports documentary films
2012 films
Table tennis films
Documentary films about old age
2010s Canadian films